Progress M-29 was a Russian unmanned Progress cargo spacecraft, which was launched in October 1995 to resupply the Mir space station.

Launch
Progress M-29 launched on 8 October 1995 from the Baikonur Cosmodrome in Kazakhstan. It used a Soyuz-U rocket.

Docking
Progress M-29 docked with the aft port of the Kvant-1 module of Mir on 10 October 1995 at 20:32:40 UTC, and was undocked on 19 December 1995 at 09:15:05 UTC.

Decay
It remained in orbit until 19 December 1995, when it was deorbited. The deorbit burn occurred at 15:26 UTC and the mission ended at 16:15 UTC.

See also

 1995 in spaceflight
 List of Progress missions
 List of uncrewed spaceflights to Mir

References

Progress (spacecraft) missions
1995 in Kazakhstan
Spacecraft launched in 1995
Spacecraft which reentered in 1995
Spacecraft launched by Soyuz-U rockets